Basov and Basova (feminine) is a common Russian surname.

People with this surname include:
Nikolay Basov (1922-2001), a Soviet physicist and educator
Vladimir Basov (1923-1987), a Soviet actor, film director and screenwriter
Ludmila Bášová (b. 1968), Czech badminton player
Tatiana Basova (b. 1984), Russian figure skater

See also
3599 Basov, asteroid

References

Russian-language surnames